New Constitution for Chile was an electoral coalition of the Equality Party and the Green Ecologist Party founded to jointly contest the 2013 general election in Chile.

It was created on August 3, 2013 and registered officially with the Electoral Service on August 19.

The main objective of the coalition, as the name says, is to create a new Constitution of the Republic of Chile by performing a constituent assembly. While the pact exists as such in the parliamentary elections and regional advisors, in the presidential election each party will support a candidate separately: Roxana Miranda by Equality Party and Alfredo Sfeir by the Green Ecologist Party.

The coalition had nine candidates for the Senate elections, forty-nine candidates for the elections to the Chamber of Deputies, and seventy-seven candidates for regional councils. One regional councillor was elected.

Composition 
The coalition consisted of two political parties and other minor political movements.

Electoral results

Deputies

Senators

Regional councillors

References

External links
Equality Party
Green Ecologist Party

Defunct left-wing political party alliances
Defunct political party alliances in Chile
Political parties established in 2013